Eupatorium leptophyllum, commonly called false fennel, is a herbaceous perennial plant in the family Asteraceae native to the southeastern United States from Mississippi to the Carolinas.  Like other members of the genus Eupatorium, it is about one to two meters (40-80 inches) tall and has inflorescences containing a large number of tiny white flower heads, each with 5 disc florets but no ray florets. E. leptophyllum grows in wet areas and can grow in shallow water, often at the edges of ponds.

References

leptophyllum
Plants described in 1836
Flora of the Southeastern United States